Dora Krsnik (born 19 January 1992) is a Croatian handball player for CS Mioveni and the Croatian national team.

She participated at the 2016 European Women's Handball Championship.

References

External links

1992 births
Living people
Croatian female handball players
Handball players from Zagreb
Expatriate handball players
Croatian expatriate sportspeople in France
Croatian expatriate sportspeople in Slovenia
RK Podravka Koprivnica players
21st-century Croatian women